Omorgus inclusus is a species of hide beetle in the subfamily Omorginae and subgenus Afromorgus.

References

inclusus
Beetles described in 1858